Zi Zhongyun (born June 1930) is a Chinese translator and historian who is an expert on US studies with the Chinese Academy of Social Sciences. She is proficient in English and French.

Biography
Zi was born into a scholarly family in Shanghai in June 1930, with her ancestral home in Leiyang, Hunan, the daughter of Tong Yijun, a Chinese officer, and Zi Yaohua, a banker and financier who was a graduate of Kyoto University, University of Pennsylvania and Harvard University. She has two sister, Zi Huayun and Zi Minyun. Zi Huayuan, a dancer and actress, was born in 1936. Zi Minyun, a physicist, was born in 1938.

Zi secondary studied at the Yaohua High School. She entered Tsinghua University in 1948, majoring in English language and French language in the Department of Western Languages and Literature, where she graduated in 1951.

After graduation, she was assigned to Chinese Ministry of Foreign Affairs.

From 1956 to 1959, she worked as a translator in Vienna. 

In 1971, she started to work at the US department affiliated with Chinese People’s Association for Friendship with Foreign Countries (CPAFFC). 

In 1979, she was diagnosed with cancer. However, she recovered fast due to imminent treatments. 

After her recovery, she visited the US and Canada for the first time as a member of the Friendly Representative led by Bingnan Wang. 

In 1980, she worked at China Institute of International Studies, then she worked at Princeton University as a researcher in 1982.

From 1985 to 1992, she worked at Chinese Academy of Social Sciences. In 1988, she accepted the promotion as the primary administrator of the US studies at Chinese Academy of Social Science. 

In 1991, she resigned from the position of administrator.

From the end of 1991 to October 1992, she was a scholar at the Woodrow Wilson International Center for Scholars, specializing in China studies. 

She retired in 1996.

Viewpoints

Comments on Her Career 
Zi categorized her career into three phases in an interview. From the 1950s to the 1970s, she worked at the World Congress of Advocates of Peace and the Chinese People’s Association for Friendship with Foreign Countries (CPAFFC). From the end of 1970 to the mid-1980, she primarily studied international affairs and politics, focusing on the US. She first worked at the China Institute of International Studies (CIIS), and then after 1985, she transferred to the Chinese Academy of Social Science. After she retired from CASS, she dedicated herself to more profound US studies and critical writing related to China’s temporary social issues. She considered the last phase the most meaningful and contributed.

Civil Education 
Zi claims that it is necessary to integrate civic education into regular classes. She emphasized in the interview that civic education enabled individuals to be aware of their rights and duties as citizens, including how to treat people properly when they are underaged and how to protect their autonomy and freedom by respecting others’ rights. A good citizen is a person who knows how to be accountable to their social obligations and advocate their rights. 

She claimed that China had entered the first stage of enlightenment of civic awareness through her observation of the 2008 Sichuan earthquake. She enumerated three pillars. First, non-governmental donation campaigns were happening nationwide. She looked forward to more charity campaigns even under governmental restrictions and regulations. Second, regional governments hindered volunteers from being helpful because the authorities would not distribute their authority and power. Third, the development of NGOs faced many obstacles and challenges under governmental scrutiny.

The Ends of Education 
Zi believes education enables citizens to access knowledge and facilitates the development of civilization and society. Furthermore, education cultivates qualified citizens, while the definition of citizenship varies from the era and social context. She emphasized the difference between citizens and subjects: citizens have fundamental rights, such as freedom of speech, the possession of the property, etc. However, citizens are also obligated to respect other citizens’ rights and should not violate them for self-interests. 

In 2019, her essay, "Mourning Tsinghua", first criticized university  administrators' neglect of historic buildings on campus, some of which were destroyed by fire in 2010. She then went on to protest the treatment of professor Xu Zhangrun, who discovered that  a student had been paid to report on the content of his lectures.  She regarded this as the "latest round of 'book burning and burying scholars'", a suppression of free thought that started with Qin Shi Huangdi.

Cold War Study 
Zi stated six pillars about how to study the Cold War as qualified scholars. 

 First, scholars should consider historical archives as primary sources to avoid subjectivity and biased narratives. 
 Second, scholars should be more patient and meticulous about discourses’ formation: coming up with research topics and thesis after reading abundant sources and documents. In this way, scholars can genuinely sense the amusement of academia. 
 Third, historical details matter. Sometimes, nuances can overturn previous prevalent theories or conclusions; however, contextualization is also crucial to correctly grasp the nuances and details. 
 Fourth, since there have been plenty of studies related to the Cold War, innovations and new ideologies are essential to effectively and meaningfully contribute to the Cold War studies. 
 Fifth, scholars should contain broader mindsets. They should realize what states rulers and leaders deem as national interests do not necessarily represent the true interests of the public and citizens. Therefore, scholars should be relatively independent of the national interests claimed by governments and political figures. 
 Finally, the goal of Cold War studies should be to maintain war peace. Therefore, scholars should authentically possess a sense of caring for peace and ethics while researching and publishing articles.

Recent 
Zi commented on China-United States relations at the 2020 Tsinghua Global Development Forum. She underscored that the future China-United States relations depended on internal development. China should insist on economic reform, integrate with the world, and value the role of technology advancement and talents. China should also make the experience of Europe a reference to prosper and thrive.

Works 
 In the 20th Century America
 Xuehai'anbian
 American Diplomatic History
 American Research

Translations
 Civil Servant (Honoré de Balzac)
 Oh, the Pioneer (Willa Cather)
 The Bohemia Girl (Willa Cather)
 The Bridges of Madison County (Robert James Waller)
 Philosophy (Alain de Botton)

Awards
 Chinese Translation Association – Competent Translator (2004)

Personal life
Zi was married to a Chinese historian, scholar and European expert, Chen Lemin, he was born in 1930 and died in 2008.

References

External links
  爱思想-资中筠专栏
  资中筠：中国发展模式不可持续 美再差也远超任何老二 on YouTube
  資中筠的講演－20111105世紀大講堂：中國的文化復興與啟蒙

1930 births
People from Leiyang
Historians from Shanghai
Yaohua High School alumni
Tsinghua University alumni
Yenching University alumni
People's Republic of China translators
English–Chinese translators
Living people
People's Republic of China essayists
People's Republic of China historians
20th-century Chinese translators
21st-century Chinese translators
20th-century essayists
21st-century essayists